Joseph Salerno may refer to:

Joseph P. Salerno, American architect
Joseph T. Salerno, American economist
Joe Salerno, American basketball coach